Maidstone, Ontario, is a small hamlet on Essex County Road 34 in the municipality of Lakeshore, Ontario, Canada, since amalgamation in 1999.  The town has a post office, a school, baseball diamonds, a park, a conservation area, a cemetery, a church, restaurant, community center and a grain elevator.

The Windsor Star in summer 2006, printed an article projecting that the community's population would soar to over 2,000 within the next 10 years (at the time, it was around 580) due to the explosive growth in Tecumseh. It is unknown if this will happen, as Maidstone is closer to Essex than to Windsor and Tecumseh.

The community was served by three main Provincial Highways in the past: Highway 3, until it was diverted onto its current alignment in 1977, Highway 114 (now just Malden Road, from CR 34/Former Highway 3, north to Middle Road, CR 46), and Highway 98, which was decommissioned in 1970, and became Essex County Road 46. It is also served by the very busy Manning Road (Essex CR 19).

Education
Schools in Maidstone include:
St. Mary Catholic Elementary School, operated by the Windsor-Essex Catholic District School Board
Maidstone Central Public School was closed before the beginning of September 2012 In 2014 it was sold to the Serbian Orthodox Eparchy of Canada, and it is now known as the Saint Petka Serbian Orthodox Church or simply as Saint Petka Parish.

References

Communities in Essex County, Ontario